H. Allen Wagener House, also known as Brandywine, is a historic home located at Jerusalem in Yates County, New York. It is a Classical Revival style structure built about 1935.

It was listed on the National Register of Historic Places in 1994.

References

Houses on the National Register of Historic Places in New York (state)
Neoclassical architecture in New York (state)
Houses completed in 1935
Houses in Yates County, New York
National Register of Historic Places in Yates County, New York